Kundalapatty is a village in the Nilakkottai Taluk in Dindigul District in Tamil Nadu, India.

It has a population nearly 2,000. This village contains multi-lingual people speaking Tamil, Telugu and Kannada. People in this village do cultivation, business and information technology jobs.

Occupations
 Citizens of this village are doing IT jobs in foreign countries like, Switzerland, Japan and US.
 Doing business in South Africa, Sri Lanka, Malaysia and Singapore.
 Working on various jobs in Dubai, Kuwait and Saudi Arabia.
 Working in bigger manufacturing companies in Chennai like Hyundai, Kiml, Shardha motors, Ador welding, etc.

Temples
Arulmigu Balamurugan Temple
Arulmigu Muthaalamman Temple
Sri Sastha Temple
Sri Pommaiyaswamy Temple
Srinivasa Perumal Temple
Arulmigu Aadhi Sakthi Veeriyakari Amman Temple
18m padi karuppasamy temple
Angalaparameshwari Temple
 and 20+ temples are there

References

Villages in Dindigul district